Mykola Oleksandrovych Myronyuk (born 19 February 2002) is a Ukrainian professional footballer who plays as a central midfielder for Ukrainian club Volyn Lutsk.

References

External links
 Profile on Volyn Lutsk official website
 

2002 births
Living people
Place of birth missing (living people)
Ukrainian footballers
Association football midfielders
FC Volyn Lutsk players
Ukrainian First League players
Ukrainian Second League players